Jin Ki-joo (born January 26, 1989) is a South Korean actress. She made a breakthrough in 2018, landing her first lead role in a television series with Come and Hug Me after she acted in that year's acclaimed series Misty and film Little Forest.

Career
Jin Ki-joo was previously an employee of Samsung SDS and then worked as reporter for SBS regional affiliate G1 before starting her acting career. After Jin won a prize in the 23rd Supermodel Contest, the organizer introduced her to some management companies for actors. Her acting debut was in tvN's 2015 romantic comedy television series Second 20s.

2018 was Jin's breakthrough year. She got nominated and won several major film awards with her role as a snarky and playful country girl who yearns for the big city in Little Forest. Her standout role as the protagonist's rival in JTBC's melodrama mystery Misty paved the way for Jin to be cast in a leading role for the first time in MBC's melodrama thriller Come and Hug Me.

In 2019, Jin starred in the SBS romantic comedy series The Secret Life of My Secretary.

Jin acted as the protagonist in KBS2's 2020 family weekend drama Homemade Love Story.

In 2022 Jin accepted two series offers, MBC's supernatural fantasy From Now On, Showtime! and KBS2's time travel mystery Run Into You.

Filmography

Films

Television series

Television shows

Music video appearances

Discography

Singles

Awards and nominations

References

External links

 
 
 

1989 births
Living people
South Korean television actresses
South Korean film actresses
South Korean web series actresses
Actresses from Seoul
21st-century South Korean actresses
Chung-Ang University alumni